Boltenstern is a Germanic surname that may refer to:

Gustaf Adolf Boltenstern (1861–1935), Swedish officer and horse rider 
Gustaf Adolf Boltenstern Jr. (1904–1995), Swedish officer and horse rider 
Walter von Boltenstern (1889–1952), Wehrmacht General during World War II

Germanic-language surnames